Macuse is a coastal town in Mozambique.

It is a short distance to the northeast of the river port of Quelimane.

Transport
It is near the site of a proposed port and railhead for the export of coal. The exact site of the port is highly variable.

See also
 Railway stations in Mozambique
 Transport in Mozambique

References

Populated coastal places in Mozambique